Mary C. Baltz (1923September 2011) was an American soil scientist.

Career 

Mary Baltz was the first woman soil scientist officially assigned in the field for the Soil Conservation Service.

After graduating from Cornell University, Baltz joined the soil survey as a Junior Soil Surveyor in 1946 and later became a Survey Party Chief.

Labor shortages during World War II gave her the opportunity to work in a job that, up to that time, had been reserved for men. By 1951, Baltz was responsible for soil mapping on farms in Madison, Oneida and Lewis counties in the state of New York, and was later assigned the task of map measurement for the entire state. The work was done by cutting out the soil map delineations on copies of the field sheets and then weighing the areas with the same label. The weight was later converted to acres.

Baltz hired the team of women to work with her in the winter months.

She worked for the  until the 1960s.

Trivia 
Mary Baltz was mentioned in a Forgotten Superheroes of Science section of The Skeptics' Guide to the Universe podcast, episode #633.

References

See also 
 NRCS New York Photo Gallery

1923 births
American soil scientists
2011 deaths
Cornell University alumni
American women scientists
21st-century American women